James Harold Hamilton (December 8, 1932 – March 1, 2009) was an American politician who served in the Alabama House of Representatives from 1986 to 2002.

Life
Hamilton was born on December 8, 1932, in Rogersville, Lauderdale County, Alabama, US to James Edward Hamilton and Myrdie Mae Hammond. He was one of 4 children. One of them dying at a very young age. He would later marry Margaret Anne Walton on May 17, 1956. They had 2 children.

Hamilton died on March 1, 2009, at the age of 76.

References

1932 births
2009 deaths
Democratic Party members of the Alabama House of Representatives
20th-century American politicians